Nikare II was a pharaoh of the Sixteenth Dynasty of Egypt. He is attested by some scarabs belonging to the British Museum, to the Petrie Museum, and to the Fraser collection.

This king should not be confused with Nikare, another pharaoh who reigned several centuries earlier.

References 

17th-century BC Pharaohs
16th-century BC Pharaohs
Pharaohs of the Sixteenth Dynasty of Egypt